Trichodes favarius is a beetle species of checkered beetles belonging to the family Cleridae, subfamily Clerinae. It can be found in Austria, Croatia, Greece, Hungary, and Italy.

References

favarius
Beetles of Europe
Beetles described in 1802